"World (The Price of Love)" is a single by English band New Order, taken from their sixth studio album, Republic (1993). Simply listed as "World" on the album, the subtitle "The Price of Love" was added for the single release, as it is repeated during the chorus. A 7:34 dance remix of the track by Paul Oakenfold, called the "Perfecto mix", was included on many releases of the single and was used for an alternate edit of the video.

Music video
The same music video was used for both the original version and an edit of the Perfecto remix of the song. Directed by Baillie Walsh and shot in Cannes with only 4 long steadicam shots, the video features the camera slowly journeying from the pier of the beach club of the exclusive luxury Carlton Hotel into the hotel itself, lingering on the faces of hotel guests.

It features the band only fleetingly – Peter Hook sits at a table on the beach club restaurant, Bernard Sumner stands overlooking the sea, and Stephen Morris and Gillian Gilbert pose for a photograph outside the Carlton Hotel; the photographer on the esplanade striking the 'Elvis' pose is percussionist David Armstrong, who was a session musician on the 'Republic' album.  This would be the last time the band would appear in a video until 2005's "Jetstream".

Track listings

Charts

References

New Order (band) songs
1993 singles
1993 songs
London Records singles
Song recordings produced by Stephen Hague
Songs written by Bernard Sumner
Songs written by Gillian Gilbert
Songs written by Peter Hook
Songs written by Stephen Morris (musician)